Frank Morris (born August 25, 1981 in Boise, Idaho) is an American competitive speedcuber.

He is best known as the 2005 World Champion for solving the Professor's Cube.  He is also known for having held World Cube Association recognized world records for both the Rubik's 4×4×4 cube single solve time, as well as the Rubik's 5×5×5 cube single solve time and average time.  Frank is also featured on the Cubefreak speedcuber trading cards.  Known aliases include "Frunk Murnis".

External links
 Frank Morris' listing at the World Cube Association

References

1981 births
Living people
People from Boise, Idaho
American speedcubers